Stay woke is a political phrase. It may also refer to:

 "Stay Woke" (Meek Mill song), a 2018 rap song featuring Miguel
 "Stay Woke" (Royce da 5'9" song), a 2018 rap song
 Stay Woke: The Black Lives Matter Movement, a 2016 American television documentary

See also
 Woke (disambiguation)